The Fussball Club Basel 1893 1994–95 season was their 102nd season since the club's foundation. Peter Epting was the club's chairman for the third period. FC Basel played their home games in the St. Jakob Stadium. Following their promotion in the previous season this was their first season back in the highest tier of Swiss football.

Overview

Pre-season
Claude Andrey was the Basel trainer for the second consecutive season. After gaining promotion during the last season, the club's priority aim was to remain in the top flight of Swiss football. Andrey tried to keep the time together after the team's promotion and only a relatively low number of players left the squad. Axel Kruse's loan period had ended and he returned to VfB Stuttgart and Sergei Derkach returned to Dynamo Moscow. Reto Baumgartner retired from active football and turned to professional beach soccer and played for the Swiss national team. Micha Rahmen and Mario Uccella moved on to local amateur club FC Riehen, and Olivier Bauer and Frank Wittmann moved on to local team Old Boys. In the other direction Lars Olsen signed in from Seraing, Asif Šarić signed in from Arminia Bielefeld, Mart van Duren came from Groningen and Alexandre Rey transferred in from Sion. A few youngsters also joined the team, Dominic Moser came from FC Birsfelden and Yassine Douimi, Markus Lichtsteiner and Roger Schreiber came via the reserve team from the youth section.

Two further youngsters joined the team during the winter break.  Because Goalkeeper Stefan Huber was injured, Andreas Niederer was signed in as second goalie from local amateur club FC Allschwil and he came to four appearances after second keeper Thomas Grüter also injured himself. Hakan Yakin signed his first professional contract in January 1995 coming in from local club Concordia Basel. He played his League debut for Basel on 12 April 1995 in the match against Lausanne Sports. He was brought on in the 60th minute as replacement for Alexandre Rey. With his first touch of the ball, just 18 seconds later, Yakin scored the goal with a header to make it 3–0 , the final score 5–0 being.

Domestic league
The 1994–95 Nationalliga A was contested by 12 teams and for Basel the season started very badly, the team lost four of the first six games and they did not record a win until the 9th round. After the first half of the Qualifying Phase, Basel and Young Boys were joint bottom of the league table with just six points. During their eleven games Basel had suffered six defeats and four draws. To this point they had scored just six goals, four of which were in the home win against Luzern, but had conceded only nine. The second half of the Qualifying Phase was better and Basel rose to 7th position in the league table. During the entire phase Basel scored just 18 goals, thus being the poorest attacking team and conceded just 15, thus being the defensive best in the league.

Basel were qualified for the Champions Round. Here things started better, three wins in the first three games. But two back to back dubbings in Lugano (1–4) as guests to Xamax (1–5), as well as the return game home defeat against Lugano, put an end to the hopes of a higher placed finish. Basel ended the 1994–95 Nationalliga A in seventh position in the table, but were qualified for the newly UEFA-administered Intertoto Cup 1995. Dario Zuffi was the team's top goal scorer with nine goals and Alexandre Rey second with five.

Swiss Cup
In the Swiss Cup Basel were drawn away from home against lower tier FC Bözingen 34 in the 3rd principal round. This resulted in a 5–0 victory, Philippe Hertig scored a brace. In the 4th round Basel faced Aarau at home in the St. Jakob Stadium and won 3–0. In the round of 16 Basel played in the Stadion Allmend but lost 0–2 to the hosts Luzern. Sion became cup winners, beating Grasshopper Club 4–2 in the final.

Players 

 
 

 
 

 

 

 
 
 
 

 
 

 
 

Players who left the squad

Results 
Legend

Friendly matches

Pre- and mid-season

Winter break and mid-season

Nationalliga A

Qualifying Phase

League table

Champions Group

League table

Swiss Cup

See also
 History of FC Basel
 List of FC Basel players
 List of FC Basel seasons

References

Sources and references
 Rotblau: Jahrbuch Saison 2015/2016. Publisher: FC Basel Marketing AG. 
 Die ersten 125 Jahre / 2018. Publisher: Josef Zindel im Friedrich Reinhardt Verlag, Basel. 
 The FCB squad 1994–95 at fcb-archiv.ch
 1994–95 at RSSSF

External links
 FC Basel official site

FC Basel seasons
Basel